Pieter Corbeels (Leuven, 12 March 1755 – Tournai, 21 June 1799) was a Belgian book printer and resistance leader. He was a founder of the Belgian-based publishing company Brepols. He commanded part of the Brabantine forces during a revolt against the French Revolutionary regime known as the Boerenkrijg ("Peasants' War"). He was executed for his role in the war.

Service in Austrian Army

Corbeels, was a corporal in the Austrian army. He fought in the rebel army of Jean-André van der Mersch, who won the Battle of Turnhout against the Austrians in 1789. After the defeat of the Brabant Revolution, he started a printing business in Leuven in 1790. He established his printing business in the Gommarushuis in the Tiensestraat in Leuven. Corbeels printed besides the ordinary, ordered printed papers, also a large number of inciting leaflets and almanacs. For this he was arrested by the French, on 28 November 1792, and transferred to Valenciennes in France. On 15 December 1792, he was released whereupon he resumed printing. In 1793 he moved into the house called Hertog van Brabant on the Grote Markt of Leuven. In 1796, he moved with his wife, Barbara Panz, and assistant, Philippus Jacobus Brepols, to Turnhout, where he was less impeded by the French. On 16 September 1797, his wife died and on 31 October he remarried with Joanna Antonia Servaes.

Life in Turnhout and Peasants War

Corbeels remarried while living in Turnhout, and he left Turnhout in the summer of 1798 as a leader of the Boerenkrijg also known as the Peasants' War (1798) against the French. On 25 November 1798, he was caught in Postel and taken by the French, whereupon he ended up in the prison, and was executed, together with Albert Meulemans, on 21 June 1799 in Tournai.

His widow initially continued the printing business, together with Philippus Jacobus Brepols, but in 1800 he bought the business from her. The Brepols printing business in Turnhout grew out of this.

References
 
 MARTENS, Erik, "De Boerenkrijg in Brabant (1798-1799). De opstand van het jaar 7 in het Dijledepartement", Uitgeverij De Krijger, 2005, blz. 50, 55–56, 111, 112, 118, 125, 127, 135, 194.\ Source used in Belgian Wikipedia biography entry

1755 births
Corbeels, Pieter
People from Turnhout
1799 deaths
Independence activists of the Brabant Revolution